Coccocarpia delicatula is a species of lichen in the family Coccocarpiaceae. Known only from the Galápagos Islands, it was described as new to science in 2011.

References

Peltigerales
Lichen species
Lichens described in 2011
Lichens of the Galápagos Islands
Taxa named by Robert Lücking